Integrity is a 2019 Hong Kong crime film written and directed by Alan Mak and starring Sean Lau, Nick Cheung and Karena Lam. The film revolves around an ICAC case involving the selling of smuggled cigarettes and is the first installment of a planned trilogy. Production for Integrity began in April 2018 and was released on 5 February 2019, the first day of the Chinese New Year holiday period.

Cast
Sean Lau as King Chan (陳敬慈), ICAC principal investigator.
Nick Cheung as Jack Hui (許植堯), King's childhood friend and an important witness of the selling of smuggled cigarettes bribery case. 
Karena Lam as Kong Suet-yee (江雪兒) an ICAC Investigator/Expert negotiator and estranged wife of Chan King-chi
Anita Yuen (guest appearance) as Chung Ka-ling (鍾嘉玲), a customs official charged with corruption.
Alex Fong (guest appearance), the ICAC Chief Investigator and supervisor of King and Shirley.
Deep Ng (guest appearance)
Carlos Chan as Gary, an ICAC Investigator and subordinate of King.
Kathy Yuen as Chi-ching (芷晴), an ICAC Investigator and subordinate of King.
Hugo Ng as Ko Ching-man (高正文), defense barrister.
Charlene Chang
Christopher Sin

Production

Development
The project was first announced to be in development in December 2017, with Alan Mak writing and directing, and his frequent collaborator Felix Chong serving as producer, and set to star Sean Lau, Nick Cheung and Karena Lam. Lau was cast as an ICAC investigator, Cheung as a widower who has also lost his daughter, and Lam as Lau's wife.

On 19 March 2018, the film was promoted at the Hong Kong Filmart, where it was attended by director/writer Mak, producers Chong and Ronald Wong and cast members Lau, Cheung, Lam, Michelle Wai and Kathy Yuen. There, Mak also revealed that he developed several stories for the film and decided that Integrity would be the first installment of a planned trilogy.

Filming
Principal photography for Integrity began in April 2018. On 11 April, a scene was filmed in a restaurant in Central, Hong Kong where Lau confronts Anita Yuen, who guest stars as a corrupt customs director. On 24 April, filming was carried out indoors with cast members Lau, Cheung, Alex Fong, Carlos Chan and Kathy Yuen, while Albert Yeung, head of Emperor Motion Pictures, also visited the set. There, Lau also revealed that director Mak helped him prepare for his role as an ICAC investigator by giving him research information and introducing him to former ICAC agents. Production for Integrity officially ended on 24 July 2018, with a wrap-up ceremony attended by the cast and crew. Aside from Hong Kong, filming also took place on location in Australia.

Box office

Opening on 5 February 2019 in Hong Kong, Integrity played to blockbuster business, with showings at multiple cinemas being sold out. The film grossed HK$3.5 million on its opening day, making it the highest single day gross of the day. On the second day of release, the film has reached a gross of HK$8 million and had quickly passed the HK$10 million mark by its third day of release. A day later, the film hs reached a gross of HK$15.05 million.

Shortly after, the film has also managed to pass the HK$20 million mark by its sixth day of release which was also the beginning of its second week of release. By 14 February, the film has reached a gross of HK$23 million. By the end of its second weekend (17 February), the film has accumulated a total gross of HK$28,078,348.

During its third week of release on 19 February, the film has passed its HK$30 million mark, making it the box office champion among local films during the Chinese New Year holiday period.

Integrity has grossed a total of HK$31,253,306 (US$3,982,632) at the Hong Kong box office and is currently the highest-grossing domestic film and the fourth-highest-grossing overall film of 2019 in the territory.

References

External links
 

2019 films
2019 crime films
Hong Kong crime films
2010s Cantonese-language films
Films directed by Alan Mak
Emperor Motion Pictures films
Films set in Hong Kong
Films shot in Hong Kong
Films shot in Australia
Independent Commission Against Corruption (Hong Kong)
2010s Hong Kong films